Samuel Hodgkinson (1817 – 10 January 1914) was a 19th-century Member of Parliament from Southland, New Zealand.

References

|-

1817 births
1914 deaths
Members of the New Zealand House of Representatives
New Zealand MPs for South Island electorates
Unsuccessful candidates in the 1879 New Zealand general election
Unsuccessful candidates in the 1890 New Zealand general election
Unsuccessful candidates in the 1884 New Zealand general election
19th-century New Zealand politicians